Decriminalization of homosexuality is the repeal of laws criminalizing same-sex acts between multiple men or multiple women. It has taken place in most of the world, except Africa and the Muslim world.

History
During the French Revolution in 1791, the National Constituent Assembly abolished the law against homosexuality as part of adopting a new legal code without the influence of Christianity. Although the assembly never discussed homosexuality, it has been legal in France ever since. Previously it could be punished by burning to death, although this was infrequently enforced. The abolition of criminality for sodomy was codified in the 1810 penal code.

The decriminalization of homosexuality was spread across Europe by Napoleon's conquests and the adoption of civil law and penal codes on the French model, leading to abolition of criminality in many jurisdictions and replacement of death with imprisonment in others. Via military occupation or emulation of the French criminal code, the Scandinavian countries, Spain, the Netherlands, Portugal, Belgium, Japan, and their colonies and territories—including much of Latin America—decriminalized homosexuality.  It is the exception rather than the rule that civil law systems criminalized homosexuality. Former French colonies are less likely than British ones to criminalize homosexuality, although such laws have been added in some colonies that adopted French criminal codes, including Egypt, Tunisia, and Lebanon. The Ottoman Empire is often considered to have decriminalized homosexuality in 1858, when it adopted a French-inspired criminal code, but  Elif Ceylan Özsoy argues that homosexuality was already decriminalized and this change of law actually penalized homosexuality more harshly than before because it introduced higher penalties for public displays of same-sex affection.

Post-World War II decriminalization trend
By 1958, Interpol had noticed a trend towards the partial criminalization of homosexuality with a higher age of consent than for heterosexual relationships. This model was recommended by various international organizations. Convergence occurred both through the partial decriminalization of homosexuality (as in the United Kingdom, and many other countries) or through the partial criminalization of homosexuality (such as in Belgium, where the first law against same-sex activity came into effect in 1965). In the decades after World War II, anti-homosexuality laws saw increased enforcement in Western Europe and the United States. Overall, there was a wave of decriminalization in the late twentieth century. Ninety percent of changes to these laws between 1945 and 2005 involved liberalization or abolition. One explanation for these legal changes is increased regard for human rights and autonomy of the individual and the effects of the 1960s sexual revolution. The trend in increased attention to individual rights in laws around sexuality has been observed around the world, but progresses more slowly in some regions, such as the Middle East.

Eighty percent of repeals between 1972 and 2002 were done by the legislature and the remainder by the laws being ruled unconstitutional by a court. The 1981 ruling in Dudgeon v. United Kingdom by the European Court of Human Rights was the first time that a court called for the decriminalization of homosexuality. Unlike earlier decriminalizations, repeal was not coincidental with the adoption of a new system of criminal law but rather by means of a specific law to repeal criminal sanctions on homosexuality, beginning with Sweden in 1944. Decriminalization, initially limited to Europe and the Americas, spread globally in the 1980s. The pace of decriminalization reached a peak in the 1990s. Following the dissolution of the Soviet Union, many former Soviet republics decriminalized homosexuality, but others in Central Asia retained these laws. China decriminalized homosexuality in 1997.  Following a protracted legal battle, the Supreme Court of India ruled that the criminalization of homosexuality violated the Constitution of India in the 2018 Navtej Singh Johar v. Union of India judgement. In 2019, a plan to punish homosexuality in Brunei with a death sentence met with international outcry; as a result, there is a moratorium on the use of the death penalty. Most Caribbean countries are former British colonies and retain the criminalization of homosexuality; Belize was the first to decriminalize it after the law was ruled unconstitutional in 2016.

Adherence to Islam is a major predictor of maintaining laws criminalizing homosexuality and the death penalty for it. The majority of studies have found no association for Christianity even though some Christian religious leaders advocate the criminalization of homosexuality. In some countries, criminalization of homosexuality derives from the application of sharia law. State interference in religious matters, for example religious courts having jurisdiction beyond family law or bans on interfaith marriage, is strongly correlated with maintaining the criminalization of homosexuality.  Studies have found that modernization, as measured by the Human Development Index or GDP per capita, and globalization (KOF Index of Globalization) was negatively correlated having laws criminalizing homosexuality over time. LGBT movements often developed after the repeal of criminal laws, but in some cases they contributed to repeal efforts. LGBT activism against criminalization can take multiple forms, including directly advocating the repeal of the laws, strategic litigation in the judicial system in order to reduce enforceability, seeking external allies from outside the country, and capacity building within the community. Although British colonization is associated with the criminalization of homosexuality, it has no effect on the likelihood of decriminalization.

In 1981, the Council of Europe passed a resolution urging the decriminalization of homosexuality and the abolition of discriminatory age of consent laws. Following the Dudgeon case the Council of Europe made decriminalization of homosexuality a requirement for membership, which in turn was a prerequisite for membership in the European Union; several European countries decided to decriminalize homosexuality as a result. The Council of Europe admitted Lithuania in 1993 a few months before the country had repealed the criminalization of homosexuality; Romania was admitted the same year after promising to repeal its law but was still enforcing it in 1998. Russia gave up its sodomy law in 1993 in part because of an aspiration to join the Council of Europe. The last jurisdiction in Europe to decriminalize homosexuality was the self-proclaimed Turkish Republic of Northern Cyprus in 2014.

Resistance to decriminalization

Africa is the only continent where decriminalization of homosexuality has not been widespread since the mid-twentieth century. In Africa, one of the primary narratives cited in favor of the criminalization of homosexuality is "defending ordre public, morality, culture, religion, and children from the assumed imperial gay agenda" associated with the Global North; homosexuality is seen as an "un-African" foreign import. Such claims ignore the fact that many indigenous African cultures tolerated homosexuality, and historically the criminalization of homosexuality derives from British colonialism. In the Middle East, homosexuality has been seen as a tool of Western domination for the same reason.

The Obama administration's policy of supporting the decriminalization of homosexuality forced African politicians to take a public stance against LGBT rights in order to retain their domestic support. The application of international pressure to decriminalize homosexuality has had mixed results in Africa. While it led to liberalization in some countries, it also prompted public opinion to be skeptical of these demands and encouraging countries to pass even more restrictive laws in resistance to what is seen as neocolonial pressure. It has therefore been argued by some scholars such as Joseph Massad that the international LGBT movement does more harm than good in Africa or the Middle East, while some African LGBT organizations have urged Western countries not to leverage donor aid on LGBT rights issues. In 2015, African academics launched a petition calling for the decriminalization of homosexuality and criticizing several common arguments against this move. Politicians may also use homosexuality to distract from other issues.

Following decolonization, several former British colonies expanded laws that had only targeted men in order to include same-sex behavior by women. In many African countries, anti-homosexuality laws were little enforced for decades only to see increasing enforcement, politicization, and calls for harsher penalties since the mid-1990s. Such calls often come from domestic religious institutions. The rise of Evangelical Christianity and especially Pentecostalism have increased the politicization of homosexuality as these churches have been engaged in anti-homosexual mobilizations as a form of nation building. Cameroon had an anti-homosexuality law since 1962, but it was not enforced until 2005. That year both the Roman Catholic Church (especially Archbishop  and Cardinal Christian Wiyghan Tumi) and the media began to make homosexuality a political issue. As of 2020, Cameroon "currently prosecutes consensual same sex conduct more aggressively than almost any country in the world". In Uganda, proposals to deepen the criminalization of homosexuality such as the so-called "Kill the Gays" bill have gained international attention. Other African countries such as South Africa, Angola, Botswana, and Mozambique have decriminalized homosexuality.

References

Sources

Further reading

Criminalization of homosexuality